Balam Ji Love You is a 2018 Indian, Bhojpuri language action, romance drama film directed by Premanshu Singh and produced by Seema Devi Rungta and Anand Kumar Rungta under the banner of " Shree Raama Production House". It stars Khesari Lal Yadav and Kajal Raghwani in lead role while Ashok Samarth, Kiran Yadav, Dev Singh, Santosh Pahalwan, Salil Sudhakar, Gajendra Brijraj and Sanjay Mahanand play supporting roles. Subhi Sharma, Smriti Sinha, Samarth Chaturvedi make a special appearance.

Plot
The film is primarily based on wrestling, paired with Raju (Khesari Lal Yadav) and Meera's (Kajal Raghwani) love story. Raju is a straight forward boy, and Meera, an educated and intelligent girl. Raju falls in love with Meera at first glance, but Meera is already engaged with Tribhuvan (Ashok Samarth) who is a champion wrestler, and he has always dominated every fight in the village. So at the starting of the movie, he defeats a wrestler named Bhanu Pratap Singh (Dev Singh). Bhanu Pratap is disheartened by his defeat and declares in his suicide note that whoever beats Tribhuvan in the wrestling match will be the successor of his property, and also his place will not be light until Tribhuvan being defeated. Since, five years have gone by and Tribhuvan still being unbeaten, the villagers try to find a tough competitor to Tribhuvan until they find Raju, whose father was also a wrestler in his good old days, but Raju has no previous experience in wrestling. In spite of being stopped by his mother, Raju still nods to the villagers because they promised him to give every food that keeps him fit as Raju's family survived on his mother's pension, and they were poor. In spite of the agreement with the villagers, Raju still doesn't have any interest in wrestling. The story moves forward in Raju trying to impress Meera, but Meera is already engaged, and so Raju decides to run away with Meera and get married. But Meera tells him that if he is really truthful, then he should fight Tribhuvan and then marry her. Tribhuvan and Raju bet on wrestling to marry with Meera. Raju defeats Tribhuvan in wrestling and marries with Meera.

Cast
Khesari Lal Yadav as Raju
Kajal Raghwani as Meera
Ashok Samarth as Tribhuvan Singh
Dev Singh as Bhanu Pratap Singh
Sanjay Mahanand as Godhan (Raju's friend) 
Santosh Pahalwan as Feku Pahalwan
Kiran Yadav as Raju's Mother
 Salil Sudhakar as Meera's Maternal uncle
 Gajendra Brijraj as Murari
Smriti Sinha as Luliya
Shubhi Sharma as special appearance in song "Body Jakad Gail Ba"
 Samarth Chaturvedi as special appearance in song "Ishq Bada Fakeera Re"

Production
The film has been shot in Lunao, a village in Gorakhpur and surrounding areas with some scenes shot in Amandi Bungalow (Madh), Adi Ankit Bungalow (Madh) and Yazoo Park (Virar) in Mumbai.

The script of "Balam Ji Love You" has been written by Surendra Mishra, while the music has been composed by Om Jha. The cinematography is by Sarfraz Khan while editing by Jeetendra Singh (Jitu). Kanu Mukharjee, Rikki Gupta and Ram Devan have choreographed the dance numbers. Andlib Pathan has directed the action and stunts in the film. Art by Nazir Shaikh and dress designed by Kavita-Sunita Creation. Background music scored by Aslam Surty while VFX by Abhishek Shrivastav (Reflection Pictures Studio).

Release
The film theatrically release on 18 October 2018 on occasion of Dussehra at Bihar, Jharkhand and Nepal. On 19 October 2018 film also released in the Mumbai and Gujarat theatres.

Soundtrack

The soundtrack for "Balam Ji Love You" was composed by Om Jha with lyrics written by Pyare Lal Yadav, Shyam Dehati, Azad Singh and Premanshu Singh. The soundtrack included an unusually large number of songs at 8. It was produced under the "Worldwide Records Bhojpuri" label, which also bought his satellite rights.

His song "Daal Ke Kewadi Me Killi" released on 19 January 2019 on YouTube and got 117 million views.

Marketing
The first-look poster was released on 16 August 2018. The first look motion poster of the film was released on 7 September 2018 on the official YouTube sub-handle of "Worldwide Records". First official poster released on 7 October 2018 and another poster released on 20 October 2018.

The trailer for the film was released on 23 September 2018 on the official YouTube account of "Worldwide Records Bhojpuri" and create a record of "Most Viewed Bhojpuri Trailer In One Day" with 3 million views.

The film also streams on Online video platform site YouTube on 26 January 2020 at official channel of "Worldwide Records Bhojpuri" and received 5 million views in just one day. As of May 2020, film crossed over 34 million views on YouTube.

References 

2018 films
Indian romantic action films
2010s Bhojpuri-language films